The Museum of the Imperial Collections  is located on the grounds of the East Garden of Tokyo Imperial Palace. It showcases a changing exhibition of a part of the imperial household treasures.

History
The Museum of the Imperial Collections was conceived during the change from the Shōwa period (1926 – 1989) to the Heisei period (1989 – 2019) . The Imperial family donated 6,000 pieces of art to the Japanese government in 1989. Many pieces were created by Imperial Household Artists. The museum was opened in 1993 for the study and preservation of the art collection. The collection was further enlarged by the donation of the art collection of Prince Chichibu (1902 – 1953) in 1996, the collection of Kikuko, Princess Takamatsu (1911 – 2004) in 2005, and the collection of Prince Mikasa family in 2014.

The number of items in the collection is 9,800 at present, but the exhibition room is a small room of 160 square meters and the storage room is small. Therefore, the existing museum will be rebuilt and the exhibition room will be expanded to 1,300 square meters. The construction is scheduled to be completed in 2025.

Selected artists

Although the museum houses many masterpieces, none of them are designated as National Treasure or Important Cultural Property because cultural properties owned by the Imperial Family or the Imperial Household Agency (Cultural properties donated to the nation by the Imperial family) are not subject to the Law for the Protection of Cultural Properties of Japan.

In 2018, in order to show the importance of cultural properties to many people in a way that is easy to understand, the Imperial Household Agency proposed that cultural properties under its management should also be designated as National Treasure or Important Cultural Property. In July 2021, the Ministry of Education, Culture, Sports, Science and Technology, in response to a proposal made by the Imperial Household Agency, decided to designate five cultural properties as National Treasures in the first stage of the designation, including Mōko Shūrai Ekotoba, an emakimono depicting the Mongol invasion of Japan,  Karajishi-zu Byōbu, a byōbu by Kano Eitoku, and Dōshoku sai-e, a painting by Ito Jakuchu.

Nihonga 
 Kaihō Yūshō (1533–1615)
 Kanō Eitoku (1543–1590)
 Iwasa Matabei (1578–1650)
 Kanō Tan'yū (1602–1674)
 Kanō Tsunenobu (1636–1713)
 Tawaraya Sōtatsu (early 17th century)
 Maruyama Ōkyo (1733–1795)
 Itō Jakuchū (1716–1800)
 Sakai Hōitsu (1761–1828)
 Hokusai (1760–1849)

Calligraphy
 Wang Xizhi (303 – 361)
 Kūkai (774 – 835)
 Ono no Michikaze (894 – 966)
 Fujiwara no Sukemasa (944 – 998)
 Fujiwara no Kintō (966 – 1041)
 Fujiwara no Yukinari (972 – 1027)
 Minamoto no Shunrai (1055–1129)
 Fujiwara no Teika (1162–1241)

Modern Nihonga
 Yokoyama Taikan (1868–1958)
 Kanzan Shimomura (1873–1930)
 Tomioka Tessai (1837–1924)
 Takeuchi Seihō (1864–1942)
 Kawai Gyokudō (1873–1957)
 Uemura Shōen (1875–1949)

Sculptures and crafts 
 Kawanobe Itcho (1831–1910)
 Miyagawa Kōzan (1842-1916)
 Asahi Gyokuzan (1843–1923)
 Unnno Shomin (1844–1915)
 Namikawa Yasuyuki (1845–1927)
 Namikawa Sōsuke (1847–1910)
 Ishikawa Komei (1852–1913)
 Takamura Kōun (1852–1934)

References

External links

 Imperial Household Agency | The Museum of the Imperial Collections

Imperial Household Agency
Art museums and galleries in Tokyo
Art museums established in 1993
Museum of the Imperial Collections